Bazaliya is an urban-type settlement in Khmelnytskyi Raion (district) of Khmelnytskyi Oblast in western Ukraine. Bazaliia belongs to Teofipol settlement hromada, one of the hromadas of Ukraine. 

Bazaliya was first founded in 1570, and it has had the status of an urban-type settlement since 1957. According to the 2001 census, its population was 2,114. Current population: 

Until 18 July 2020, Bazaliia belonged to Teofipol Raion. The raion was abolished in July 2020 as part of the administrative reform of Ukraine, which reduced the number of raions of Khmelnytskyi Oblast to three. The area of Teofipol Raion was merged into Khmelnytskyi Raion.

References

External links

 The murder of the Jews of Bazaliia during World War II, at Yad Vashem website.

Urban-type settlements in Khmelnytskyi Raion
Volhynian Governorate
Populated places established in 1570
1570 establishments in the Polish–Lithuanian Commonwealth
Holocaust locations in Ukraine